Nürnberg-Mögeldorf station is a railway station in the city of Nuremberg, in Bavaria, Germany. It is located on the  Nuremberg–Schwandorf line of Deutsche Bahn. It is served by the S1 of the Nuremberg S-Bahn as well as Nuremberg tramway line 5.

A Nuremberg tramway stop (line 5) and a bus stop is situated in north to the station.

References

Mogeldorf
Mögeldorf
Railway stations in Germany opened in 1859
1859 establishments in Bavaria